Jesus Hernando Gutierrez Mansilla (died November 2008) was a Bolivian lawyer and alleged cocaine trafficker.

Biography

Criminal career
He was the son of Alfredo "Cutuchi" Gutierrez, a notorious drug lord. Commonly known as "Nando" he gained notoriety when he was arrested in 1993 for his alleged involvement in the Narco Statue case where authorities seized a large amount of cocaine concealed inside tiny statues that were to be exported. According to Gutiérrez, he was taken to a detention house immediately after his arrest where he was tortured by Bolivian FELCN and DEA agents. He was never convicted and was out on parole within a few years.

Death
In November 2008 Gutierrez was stabbed to death by an unknown assailant. The motives behind this murder are still unclear.

References

2008 deaths
Year of birth missing
Bolivian murder victims
Unsolved murders in South America
20th-century Bolivian lawyers
Deaths by stabbing in Paraguay